Nissi may refer to:
Nishi language, a language spoken in Arunachal Pradesh, India.
Nissi Parish, Estonia.
Nissi, part of Riisipere small borough, Estonia.
Jehovah-Nissi.